Glasgow-based Gaelic folk group Na h-Òganaich (Scottish Gaelic for 'the young ones' though often translated as 'young blood' ) formed early in 1971, following a concert in Dunoon where Mod Gold Medallist singer Margaret MacLeod first met guitarist Noel Eadie. Margaret casually mentioned that her brother Donnie was learning guitar, so a decision was made to form a trio to enter the Folk Group competition at the Royal National Mòd.

A friend from the Isle of Lewis, Donnie MacLean, was working with the BBC and introduced them to recordings of the little-known Melbost Bard, Murdo Macfarlane. Recognising the originality and catchiness of Murdo's songs, the trio took two of them to the Royal National Mòd in Stirling in October 1971, where they won the Folk group competition and created an immediate stir with their professional performance and novel songs.

The following year they performed another of Murdo's songs (Mi le m' Uillinn) and won the New Song competition at the Pan-Celtic Festival in Killarney, Ireland, introducing themselves on to the international stage. This led to engagements throughout the Celtic Language speaking world: in England, Canada, Wales and Brittany.

The group recorded three albums for the Beltona Sword label, a branch of Decca Records - The Great Gaelic Sound of Na h-Òganaich (1972), Gael Force Three (1973) and Scot-Free (1975).

In 1976 Na h-Òganaich were invited to participate in an extended tour of the US. At that time Noel was working as a college lecturer and unable to take part, so Margaret and Donnie proceeded to tour, and later perform back in the UK, as a duo with backing musicians.

The original group has reformed on several occasions since then on a one-off basis, notably at Fèis nan Còisir in Stornoway and at Celtic Connections in Glasgow (2007). Margaret has continued to sing professionally with accordionist Billy Anderson, while Donnie in the 1980s became a popular TV performer and presenter with the children's Gaelic TV programme Dotaman on BBC Scotland. Noel has been living and working in education on the Isle of Lewis since 1978.

External links
"Na h-Òganaich: a Gael Force for good." West Highland Free Press.
Discography

Scottish folk music groups
Scottish Gaelic music